Shall-Zwall is a small dialect cluster of Plateau languages in Nigeria.

References

External links
Shall-Zwall wordlist

Beromic languages
Languages of Nigeria